The 1958 United States Senate election in Maine was held on September 8, 1958 to elect a United States senator. Incumbent Republican Senator Frederick G. Payne lost re-election to a second term. 

Senator Frederick Payne was defeated in his bid for a second term by a wide margin. This was one of a record twelve seats Democrats gained from the Republican Party.

Republican primary

Candidates
 Frederick G. Payne, incumbent Senator
 Herman D. Sahagian, former member of the Maine Republican Committee

Results

Democratic primary

Candidates
 Edmund Muskie, Governor of Maine

Results
Governor Muskie was unopposed for the Democratic nomination.

General election

Results

See also 
 1958 United States Senate elections

References 

1958
Maine
United States Senate